Lauri Kalle Juhani Kerminen (born 18 January 1993) is a Finnish professional volleyball player. He is a member of the Finland national team, and a participant at the 2017 and 2015 European Championship. At the professional club level, he plays for Dynamo Moscow.

Honours

Clubs
 CEV Cup
  2020/2021 – with Dynamo Moscow

 National championships
 2012/2013  Finnish Championship, with Kokkolan Tiikerit 
 2013/2014  Finnish Cup, with Kokkolan Tiikerit 
 2018/2019  Russian Championship, with Kuzbass Kemerovo  
 2019/2020  Russian SuperCup, with Kuzbass Kemerovo 
 2020/2021  Russian Cup, with Dynamo Moscow
 2020/2021  Russian Championship, with Dynamo Moscow
 2020/2021  Russian SuperCup, with Dynamo Moscow
 2021/2022  Russian Championship, with Dynamo Moscow
 2021/2022  Russian SuperCup, with Dynamo Moscow

References

External links

 
 Player profile at Volleybox.net

1993 births
Living people
People from Suonenjoki
Sportspeople from North Savo
Finnish men's volleyball players
Finnish expatriate sportspeople in France
Expatriate volleyball players in France
Finnish expatriate sportspeople in Russia
Expatriate volleyball players in Russia
Liberos